Suryavinayak Temple is a Hindu Temple in Nepal. It is located in Bhaktapur district, Nepal. The temple is dedicated to the Hindu god Ganesh. The temple is an historical and cultural monument and tourist centre. The Suryavinayak Temple is one of the four popular shrines of Lord Ganesh in the  Kathmandu Valley. The temple is also known as the temple of the rising sun.

Location
The temple is located about two kilometres from the city.  It is situated in a forest and can only be reached on foot. The temple is in sipadol VDC and is a good place. The place is holy and it is said to be that all of our sorrows and pains would wash away.

History
The temple is believed to have been originally built over 1500 years ago. The temple was built in the time of the Lichhavi King Vishnu Dev Barma.[2]

References

External links

Hindu temples in Lumbini Province
Hindu temples in Kathmandu District